Dan Blum (born 1958) is an American author. His most recent book is The Feet Say Run (Gabriel's Horn Press, 2016), a literary novel set in World War II. The novel tells the tale of Hans Jaeger in Nazi Germany, the Jewish girl he loved, and his years fighting with the Wehrmacht.

Blum generated controversy with the publication of The Feet Say Run, with some calling the book "an apology for the perpetrators of the Holocaust". He responded to these criticisms in an article published in Publishers Weekly by defending his right as an author to publish based on "a time and a place and a set of individuals living in that place".

Blum is also the author of Lisa 33 (Viking Press, 2003), the influential postmodern comedy set on the Internet, which was published under the pseudonym Dan Allan and received positive attention and reviews from Kirkus Reviews and Entertainment Weekly.

Blum was interviewed by Psychology Today on the challenges of writing and publishing fiction. He has appeared on the popular Spectrum Books podcast speaking about the transition from a publishing deal with a New York publishing house to working with an independent publisher. Blum has also spoken extensively with the literary community about the writing process and ethics of his content.

Blum runs a humor and political satire blog The Rotting Post, which is co-branded as The Trumplandia Review.

Published works
Novels

References

External links
 Trumplandia Review (The Rotting Post) - Political Blog
 Dan Blum's Facebook Page

1958 births
Living people
Brandeis University alumni
Writers from Boston